Faith Edith Smith (October 10, 1873 – March 5, 1957) was a librarian on the Education Committee of the American Library Association.

Early life and family
Faith Edith Smith was born on October 10, 1873, in Aurora, Illinois, the daughter of William B. Smith and Mary Margaret Ferner. Mary Margaret Ferner was born on September 4, 1844, in Ohio, and died on March 9, 1920, the daughter of George Ferner ( 1815–1893) and Catherine Weyand/Weyhandt (1812–1892); Mary M. Ferner married William B. Smith on October 20, 1969, in Tazewell County, Illinois; William was born on December 6, 1844, and died on January 17, 1910, in Aurora, Illinois. They had two children, Faith Edith Smith and Edwin Justus Smith, born November 1, 1875, and died August 17, 1934.

Smith attended Aurora High School and then obtained a Ph. B. at Northwestern University, where she joined the University Women's Club.

While at College, Smith was the president of the Young Women's Christian Association from 1894 to 1895 and assistant at Northwestern University Library from 1896 to 1898. She was a graduate student in French (1896–97) and in History (1897–98) and won the Alumni Merit Award in 1896. From 1898 to 1900 she was a student at New York State Library School, where again she was assistant at the Library from 1898 to 1900, and obtained a B. L. S.

Career
Faith Edith Smith was the principal of the Philosophy and Religion Department at Los Angeles Public Library.

Smith was on the Education Committee of the American Library Association and was a member of the California Library Association.

Smith was a member of the Philosophical Union.

In 1922, Smith co-edited Best Books of 1921 Selected for a Small Public Library.

Personal life
Faith Edith Smith started as librarian at Sedalia, Missouri, in 1900, and lived at 219 Clark St., Aurora. She then moved to California, in 1917 and lived at 5007 Townsend Ave., Los Angeles, California.

Smith died on March 5, 1957, and is buried at Spring Lake Cemetery, Aurora.

References

1873 births
1957 deaths
Northwestern University alumni
American librarians
American women librarians
People from Aurora, Illinois